The Voyager Golden Records are two phonograph records that were included aboard both Voyager spacecraft launched in 1977. The records contain sounds and images selected to portray the diversity of life and culture on Earth, and are intended for any intelligent extraterrestrial life form who may find them. The records are a time capsule.

Although neither Voyager spacecraft is heading toward any particular star, Voyager 1 will pass within 1.6 light-years' distance of the star Gliese 445, currently in the constellation Camelopardalis, in about 40,000 years.

Carl Sagan noted that "The spacecraft will be encountered and the record played only if there are advanced space-faring civilizations in interstellar space, but the launching of this 'bottle' into the cosmic 'ocean' says something very hopeful about life on this planet."

Background 
The Voyager 1 probe is currently the farthest human-made object from Earth. Both Voyager 1 and Voyager 2 have reached interstellar space, the region between stars where the galactic plasma is present. Like their predecessors Pioneer 10 and 11, which featured a simple plaque, both Voyager 1 and Voyager 2 were launched by NASA with a message aboard—a kind of time capsule, intended to communicate to extraterrestrials a story of the world of humans on Earth.

Contents 

The contents of the record were selected for NASA by a committee chaired by Carl Sagan of Cornell University. The selection of content for the record took almost a year. Sagan and his associates assembled 115 images and a variety of natural sounds, such as those made by surf, wind, thunder and animals (including the songs of birds and whales). To this they added audio content to represent humanity: spoken greetings in 55 ancient and modern languages, including a spoken greeting in English by U.N. Secretary-General Kurt Waldheim and a greeting by Sagan's six-year-old son, Nick; other human sounds, like footsteps and laughter (Sagan's); the inspirational message Per aspera ad astra in Morse code; and musical selections from different cultures and eras. The record also includes a printed message from U.S. president Jimmy Carter.

The collection of images includes many photographs and diagrams both in black and white, and color. The first images are of scientific interest, showing mathematical and physical quantities, the Solar System and its planets, DNA, and human anatomy and reproduction. Care was taken to include not only pictures of humanity, but also some of animals, insects, plants and landscapes. Images of humanity depict a broad range of cultures. These images show food, architecture, and humans in portraits as well as going about their day-to-day lives. Many pictures are annotated with one or more indications of scales of time, size, or mass. Some images contain indications of chemical composition. All measures used on the pictures are defined in the first few images using physical references that are likely to be consistent anywhere in the universe.

The musical selection is also varied, featuring works by composers such as J.S. Bach (interpreted by Glenn Gould), Mozart, Beethoven (played by the Budapest String Quartet), and Stravinsky. The disc also includes music by Guan Pinghu, Blind Willie Johnson, Chuck Berry, Kesarbai Kerkar, Valya Balkanska, and electronic composer Laurie Spiegel, as well as Azerbaijani folk music (Mugham) by oboe player Kamil Jalilov. The inclusion of Berry's "Johnny B. Goode" was controversial, with some claiming that rock music was "adolescent", to which Sagan replied, "There are a lot of adolescents on the planet." The selection of music for the record was completed by a team composed of Carl Sagan as project director, Linda Salzman Sagan, Frank Drake, Alan Lomax, Ann Druyan as creative director, artist Jon Lomberg, ethnomusicologist Robert E. Brown, Timothy Ferris as producer, and Jimmy Iovine as sound engineer. It also included the sounds of humpbacked whales from the 1970 album by Roger Payne, Songs of the Humpback Whale.

The Golden Record also carries an hour-long recording of the brainwaves of Ann Druyan. During the recording of the brainwaves, Druyan thought of many topics, including Earth's history, civilizations and the problems they face, and what it was like to fall in love.

After NASA had received criticism over the nudity on the Pioneer plaque (line drawings of a naked man and woman), the agency chose not to allow Sagan and his colleagues to include a photograph of a nude man and woman on the record. Instead, only a silhouette of the couple was included. However, the record does contain "Diagram of vertebrate evolution", by Jon Lomberg, with drawings of an anatomically correct naked male and naked female, showing external organs. The person waving on the diagram was also changed: on the Pioneer plaque, the man is waving, while on the "Vertebrate evolution" image, the woman is waving.

The pulsar map and hydrogen molecule diagram are shared in common with the Pioneer plaque.

The 115 images are encoded in analogue form and composed of 512 vertical lines. The remainder of the record is audio, designed to be played at  revolutions per minute.

Jimmy Iovine, who was still early in his career as a music producer, served as sound engineer for the project at the recommendation of John Lennon, who was contacted to contribute but was unable to take part.

Sagan's team wanted to include the Beatles song "Here Comes the Sun" on the record, but the record company EMI, which held the copyrights, declined. In the 1978 book Murmurs of Earth, the failure to secure permission for the song is cited as one of the legal challenges faced by the team compiling the Voyager Golden Record. In the book, Sagan said that the Beatles favoured the idea, but "[they] did not own the copyright, and the legal status of the piece seemed too murky to risk." When asked about the obstacle presented by EMI with regard to "Here Comes the Sun", despite the artists' wishes, Ann Druyan said in 2015: "Yeah, that was one of those cases of having to see the tragedy of our planet. Here's a chance to send a piece of music into the distant future and distant time, and to give it this kind of immortality, and they're worried about money ... we got this telegram [from EMI] saying that it will be $50,000 per record for two records, and the entire Voyager record cost $18,000 to produce." However, this was denied in 2017 by Timothy Ferris; in his recollection, "Here Comes the Sun" was never considered for inclusion.

In July 2015, NASA uploaded the audio contents of the record to the audio streaming service SoundCloud.

Images

Playback 

In the upper left-hand corner of the record cover is a drawing of the phonograph record and the stylus carried with it. The stylus is in the correct position to play the record from the beginning. Written around it in binary notation is the correct time of one rotation of the record, 3.6 seconds, expressed in time units of 0.70 billionths of a second, the time period associated with a fundamental transition of the hydrogen atom. The drawing indicates that the record should be played from the outside in. Below this drawing is a side view of the record and stylus, with a binary number giving the time to play one side of the record—about an hour (more precisely, between 53 and 54 minutes).

The information in the upper right-hand portion of the cover is designed to show how pictures are to be constructed from the recorded signals. The top drawing shows the typical signal that occurs at the start of a picture. The picture is made from this signal, which traces the picture as a series of vertical lines, similar to analog television (in which the picture is a series of horizontal lines). Picture lines 1, 2 and 3 are noted in binary numbers, and the duration of one of the "picture lines," about 8 milliseconds, is noted. The drawing immediately below shows how these lines are to be drawn vertically, with staggered "interlace" to give the correct picture rendition. Immediately below this is a drawing of an entire picture raster, showing that there are 512 (29) vertical lines in a complete picture. Immediately below this is a replica of the first picture on the record to permit the recipients to verify that they are decoding the signals correctly. A circle was used in this picture to ensure that the recipients use the correct ratio of horizontal to vertical height in picture reconstruction. Color images were represented by three images in sequence, one each for red, green, and blue components of the image. A color image of the spectrum of the sun was included for calibration purposes.

The drawing in the lower left-hand corner of the cover is the pulsar map previously sent as part of the plaques on Pioneers 10 and 11. It shows the location of the Solar System with respect to 14 pulsars, whose precise periods are given. The drawing containing two circles in the lower right-hand corner is a drawing of the hydrogen atom in its two lowest states, with a connecting line and digit 1 to indicate that the time interval associated with the transition from one state to the other is to be used as the fundamental time scale, both for the time given on the cover and in the decoded pictures.

Manufacturing

Blank records were provided by the Pyral S.A. of Créteil, France. CBS Records contracted the JVC Cutting Center in Boulder, Colorado to cut the lacquer masters which were then sent to the James G. Lee record-processing center in Gardena, California to cut and gold-plate eight Voyager records. After the records were plated they were mounted in aluminum containers and delivered to JPL.

The record's cover is aluminum and electroplated upon it is an ultra-pure sample of the isotope uranium-238. Uranium-238 has a half-life of 4.468 billion years. It is possible (e.g., via mass spectrometry) that a civilization that encounters the record will be able to use the ratio of remaining uranium to the other elements to determine the age of the record.

The records also had the inscription "To the makers of music – all worlds, all times" hand-etched on its surface. The inscription was located in the "takeout grooves", an area of the record between the label and playable surface. Since this was not in the original specifications, the record was initially rejected, to be replaced with a blank disc. Sagan later convinced the administrator to include the record as is.

Journey 

Voyager 1 was launched in 1977, passed the orbit of Pluto in 1990, and left the Solar System (in the sense of passing the termination shock) in November 2004. It is now in the Kuiper belt. In about 40,000 years, it and Voyager 2 will each come to within about 1.8 light-years of two separate stars: Voyager 1 will have approached star Gliese 445, located in the constellation Camelopardalis, and Voyager 2 will have approached star Ross 248, located in the constellation of Andromeda.

In March 2012, Voyager 1 was over 17.9 billion km from the Sun and traveling at a speed of 3.6 AU per year (approximately ), while Voyager 2 was over 14.7 billion km away and moving at about 3.3 AU per year (approximately ).

In May 2005, it was reported that Voyager 1 had entered the heliosheath, the region beyond the termination shock. The termination shock is where the solar wind, a thin stream of electrically charged gas blowing continuously outward from the Sun, is slowed by pressure from gas between the stars.

Of the eleven instruments carried on Voyager 1, four are still operational and continue to send back data. It is expected that there will be insufficient energy to power any of the instruments beyond 2025.

On September 12, 2013, NASA announced that Voyager 1 had left the heliosheath and entered interstellar space, although it still remains within the Sun's gravitational sphere of influence.

Depictions in culture 

Several works of science fiction, such as the 1979 film Star Trek: The Motion Picture, the 1984 film Starman, the 2000 film Battlefield Earth, and the animated television show Beast Wars feature extraterrestrial intelligences discovering the record and turning their attention to Earth as a result.

In a Saturday Night Live segment ("Next Week in Review") in episode 64 of the show's third season (originally aired 1978), Steve Martin's character, a psychic named Cocuwa, announced that extraterrestrials had responded to the record with the four words "Send more Chuck Berry".

The recording is a major plot piece of "Little Green Men", a season 2 episode of The X-Files.

On Star Trek: Voyager, the Greetings from Earth on the golden record are sent to Voyager by Rain Robinson in Season 3, Episode 8 "Future's End".

In the 2004 episode of The West Wing, "The Warfare of Genghis Khan" (season 5 episode 13), the golden record is referenced. In particular, Josh Lyman (played by Bradley Whitford), notes the inclusion of Blind Willie Johnson's "Dark Was the Night, Cold Was the Ground" on the record as inspirational.

It was also referenced in the 2005 animation known as Fafner in the Azure as being one of the objects that the aliens discover.

In 2014, the podcast The Truth produced an episode titled "Voyager Found", where the Voyager crash-lands on the property of Dawn and Tad, an alien couple, who decide to play the record.

In 2014, composer Dario Marianelli wrote a Voyager Concerto for Violin and Orchestra, which was premiered in Brisbane, Australia in November that year by the Queensland Symphony Orchestra (QSO), and in Stockholm the following April (2015), by the Swedish Radio Orchestra. The QSO, with British violinist Jack Liebeck, performed the piece over several concerts at the Queensland Performing Arts Centre; each performance was preceded by a lecture by physicist professor Brian Cox, who talked at length about NASA's Voyager Mission, and introduced the concerto. The 30-minute piece, in one single movement, depicts the journey of the Voyager through the Solar System, using as references some of the music that is on board each probe, on the Golden Record.

The Voyager probes are a visitable landmark in the 2014 space-trading/simulation game Elite: Dangerous. It is possible to see the golden record on the probe models.

The stageplay Voyage to Voyager depicts the team of scientists, including Carl and Linda Sagan, Frank Drake, Tim Ferris, Ann Druyan, and Jon Lomberg, as they work to create the Golden Record. It premiered at the Kansas City Fringe Festival in 2015.

English folk artist Jim Moray released the song "Sounds of Earth" on his 2016 album Upcetera. Named after the golden record, it tells the story of the project with a particular focus on the relationship between Carl Sagan and Ann Druyan.

Grace Petrie, an English songwriter and folk singer, released a track by the name of "The Golden Record" on her 2017 album Heart First Aid Kit, which is a love song based upon the story of Carl Sagan and Ann Druyan, referencing the additions made to the record intended to depict the sound of human beings in love.

The 2017 documentary The Farthest, directed by Emer Reynolds, features those who worked on the Golden Record and Voyager missions including Frank Drake, Timothy Ferris, and Nick Sagan.

Troop Zero, a 2019 American comedy-drama film, inspired by Alibar's 2010 play Christmas and Jubilee Behold the Meteor Shower, focuses on the story of a scout group competing to have their voices included on the Golden Record.

The 2019 death metal album Death Atlas by Cattle Decapitation opens with a track that samples the greetings on the Golden Record in their entirety. 

Released in 2020, the plunderphonics album We Will Always Love You by The Avalanches samples heavily from the Golden Record.

The 2020 indie rock album Possession by Joywave features sounds from the record.

Publications 
Most of the images used on the record (reproduced in black and white), together with information about its compilation, can be found in the 1978 book Murmurs of Earth: The Voyager Interstellar Record by Carl Sagan, F. D. Drake, Ann Druyan, Timothy Ferris, Jon Lomberg, and Linda Salzman. A CD-ROM version was issued by Warner New Media in 1992. Author Ann Druyan, who later married Carl Sagan, wrote about the Voyager Record in the epilogue of Sagan's final book Billions and Billions (1997).

To celebrate the 40th anniversary of the record, Ozma Records launched a Kickstarter project to release the record contents in LP format as part of a box set also containing a hardcover book, turntable slipmat, and art print. The Kickstarter was successfully funded with over $1.4 million raised. Ozma Records then produced another edition of the three-disc LP vinyl record box set that also includes the audio content of the Golden Record, softcover book containing the images encoded on the record, images sent back by Voyager, commentary from Ferris, art print, turntable slipmat, and a collector's box. This edition was released in February 2018 along with a 2xCD-Book edition. In January 2018, Ozma Records' "Voyager Golden Record; 40th Anniversary Edition" won a Grammy Award for best boxed or limited-edition package.

Track listing 

The track listing is as it appears on the 2017 edition released by Ozma Records.
Disc one

Disc two

See also 

 Arecibo message
 Communication with extraterrestrial intelligence
 Pioneer plaque
 Time capsule

References 

 Originally based on public domain text from the NASA website , where selected images and sounds from the record can be found.

External links 

 
 

Golden record
Interstellar messages
Search for extraterrestrial intelligence
Time capsules
1977 albums
United States National Recording Registry recordings
Technology in society
Message artifacts
1977 in spaceflight
Music in space